Nomzamo is the third studio album by the British neo-progressive rock band IQ, released in May 1987 by Squawk Records and distributed by Mercury Records internationally, by Vertigo Records in the United Kingdom and by Metronome in West Germany. Recorded at Chipping Norton Recording Studios in Chipping Norton, Oxfordshire, England, from January to February 1987, it was produced by Ken Thomas. It was the first disc recorded without lead singer Peter Nicholls, who was replaced by P.L. Menel.

Track listing

Personnel

IQ
 P.L. Menel – lead vocals, backing vocals
 Mike Holmes – electric and acoustic guitars, guitar synthesizer
 Tim Esau – bass guitar, bass pedals, rhythm guitar on "Passing Strangers", backing vocals
 Martin Orford – keyboards, backing vocals
 Paul Cook – drums, percussion

Additional musicians
 Micky Groome – backing vocals
 Ray Carless – saxophone
 Jules O'Kine – vocal duet on "Colourflow"

Technical personnel
 Ken Thomas – producer
 Barry Hammond – engineer (at Chipping Norton Recording Studios, Chipping Norton, Oxfordshire, England)
 Gerard Johnson – engineer (at Music Works Recording Studio, Kingston, Jamaica)
 Chris Morton – sleeve design
 Paul Cox – photography

References

IQ (band) albums
1987 albums